Warren Bruce Rudman (May 18, 1930November 19, 2012) was an American attorney and Republican politician who served as United States Senator from New Hampshire between 1980 and 1993. He was known as a moderate centrist, to such an extent that President Clinton approached him in 1994 about replacing departing Treasury Secretary Lloyd Bentsen in Clinton's cabinet, an offer that Rudman declined.

After two terms in office, Rudman chose not to run for re-election in 1992. At the time of his death, he was a co-chair of Albright Stonebridge Group; a retired partner in the international law firm Paul, Weiss, Rifkind, Wharton & Garrison; and an advisory board member of Promontory Financial Group. He previously sat on the board of directors of Raytheon, Collins & Aikman, Allied Waste, Boston Scientific and a number of funds in the Dreyfus Family of Funds.

Early life and education
Rudman was born in Boston, Massachusetts, the son of Theresa (née Levenson) and Edward
G. Rudman. His family were Jewish immigrants from Germany, Poland, and Russia. Rudman lived his entire life in New Hampshire, with few exceptions. He attended the Valley Forge Military Academy boarding school in Wayne, Pennsylvania. He received his undergraduate degree from Syracuse University, and served in the United States Army during the Korean War. He received his J.D. degree from Boston College Law School in 1960, and was appointed Attorney General of New Hampshire in 1970; serving in that capacity until 1976.

Career
From 2004 to 2006, Rudman led a team of attorneys that investigated accounting practices at Fannie Mae.

Prior to the September 11 attacks, Rudman had served on a now oft-cited national panel investigating the threat of international terrorism. He, along with fellow former Senator Gary Hart (D-CO), chaired the panel, and both Rudman and Hart have been lauded since September 11 for their prescient conclusions.

Rudman was an Advisory Board member and Co-Chair of the Partnership for a Secure America, a not-for-profit organization dedicated to recreating the bipartisan center in American national security and foreign policy.

Rudman was one of the few Jewish politicians elected in New Hampshire. He spent his final years as a resident of Hollis, New Hampshire, a suburb of both Nashua and Boston.

He was the author of a memoir called Combat.

Senate career

Rudman defeated incumbent John Durkin in the 1980 election, riding the wave of Ronald Reagan's landslide victory. Durkin resigned and the Governor appointed Rudman to fill the vacancy in late December 1980. Rudman served on the Senate Appropriations Committee and the Ethics Committee. His best-known legislative effort was the Gramm-Rudman-Hollings Act.

A moderate Republican, Rudman was conservative on matters of fiscal and defense policy—favoring tax cuts, reduced domestic spending, and higher military spending, but liberal on social issues—supporting a woman's right to choose to have an abortion, gay rights, and opposing a constitutional amendment mandating voluntary school prayer.  Rudman, along with John H. Sununu, was a key player in the appointment of Rudman's personal friend, Supreme Court Justice David Souter, to both the First Circuit Court of Appeals and the Supreme Court. The Wall Street Journal later editorialized about the appointment, saying: "Rudman, the man who helped put liberal jurist David Souter on the high court" and who in his "Yankee Republican liberalism" took "pride in recounting how he sold Mr. Souter to gullible White House chief of staff John Sununu as a confirmable conservative. Then they both sold the judge to President Bush, who wanted above all else to avoid a confirmation battle." Rudman wrote in his memoir that he had "suspected all along" that Souter would not "overturn activist liberal precedents." Sununu later said of Rudman, "In spite of it all, he's a good friend. But I've always known that he was more liberal than he liked the world to think he was."

Post-Senate years
After leaving the Senate, Rudman continued to practice law and be an active member in national politics. Senator John McCain's asked Rudman to serve as his campaign chair during McCain's 2000 presidential campaign. On January 8, 2001, he was presented with the Presidential Citizens Medal by President Clinton.

He was twice considered as a possible vice presidential candidate on the ticket of two parties other than the GOP. In 1996, Ross Perot offered Rudman the slot to be his vice presidential running mate on the Reform Party ticket, but Rudman refused (as did former Democratic Senator David Boren of Oklahoma). Perot eventually selected Pat Choate. In 2004, Rudman was mentioned as possible running mate for Democratic nominee John Kerry. Kerry eventually selected John Edwards.

In 1999, a leaked report by the U.S. National Drug Intelligence Center (NDIC) stated that Carlos Hank González, a Mexican criminal, politician and influential businessman, and his two sons are so involved in drug trafficking and money laundering that they "pose a significant criminal threat to the United States." After the report was disclosed, the Hank family mobilized to rebut the allegations, hiring high-profile lawyers including Rudman. Rudman was an attorney with the law firm Paul, Weiss, Rifkind, Wharton & Garrison, and represented Hank Gonzalez's oldest son, Carlos Hank Rhon.

Rudman lobbied the government to disavow the report and in March 2000 Attorney General Janet Reno wrote a letter that said the report "was beyond the substantive expertise and area of responsibility of the NDIC.″ At Rudman's request, a copy of Reno's letter was sent to Federal Reserve Board Chairman Alan Greenspan because of the Hank family's banking interests in the United States. Carlos Hank Rhon was later fined $40 million to settle charges that he violated banking laws when he bought Laredo National Bancshares in Texas and failed to disclose the sale of a $20 million share in Laredo National to his father.

He was a co-chair, along with former Secretary of State Madeleine Albright and former National Security Advisor Sandy Berger, of Albright Stonebridge Group, a global business consulting and strategy firm based in Washington, D.C.

He died of cancer on November 19, 2012. His death came only a month after his predecessor John Durkin had died.

After his death, President Obama praised Rudman as an early advocate for fiscal responsibility.

See also
U.S. Commission on National Security/21st Century (Hart-Rudman Commission)
List of Jewish members of the United States Congress

References

External links

 
 Obituary from Pittsburgh Post-Gazette

|-

|-

|-

|-

|-

|-

1930 births
2012 deaths
Jewish American military personnel
American people of German-Jewish descent
American people of Polish-Jewish descent
American people of Russian-Jewish descent
American prosecutors
Boston College Law School alumni
Jewish American people in New Hampshire politics
Jewish United States senators
Lawyers from Boston
Military personnel from Massachusetts
New Hampshire Attorneys General
New Hampshire Republicans
Politicians from Manchester, New Hampshire
Politicians from Boston
Presidential Citizens Medal recipients
Republican Party United States senators from New Hampshire
Syracuse University alumni
United States Army officers
Recipients of the National Intelligence Distinguished Service Medal
Paul, Weiss, Rifkind, Wharton & Garrison people
Valley Forge Military Academy and College alumni
Burials at Arlington National Cemetery
20th-century American lawyers
United States Army personnel of the Korean War
21st-century American lawyers
21st-century American politicians
20th-century American politicians
21st-century American Jews
Deaths from cancer in Washington, D.C.
Members of Congress who became lobbyists